Eupithecia stigmaticata is a moth in the family Geometridae. It is found in Turkmenistan.

References

Moths described in 1885
stigmaticata
Moths of Asia